Cyrtodactylus teyniei is a species of gecko, a lizard in the family Gekkonidae. The species is endemic to Laos.

Etymology
The specific name, teyniei, is in honor of French herpetologist Alexandre Teynié, who collected the holotype.

Geographic range
C. teyniei is found in central Laos, in Borikhamxay Province.

Habitat
The preferred natural habitats of C. teyniei are forest and dry caves.

Description

Reproduction
The mode of reproduction of C. teyniei is unknown.

References

Further reading
David P, Nguyen TQ, Schneider N, Ziegler T (2011). "A new species of the genus Cyrtodactylus Gray, 1827 from central Laos (Squamata: Gekkonidae)". Zootaxa 2833: 29–40. (Cyrtodactylus teyniei, new species).

Cyrtodactylus
Reptiles described in 2011